Saint-Affrique (Languedocien: Sant Africa) is a commune in the Aveyron department in Southern France.

History
Saint-Affrique grew in the 6th century around the tomb of St. Africain, bishop of Comminges. In the 12th century a fortress was built on the neighboring rock of Caylus. The possession of Saint-Affrique was vigorously contested during the French Wars of Religion. It was eventually occupied by the Huguenots until 1629, when it was seized and dismantled by a royal army.

Geography
The Sorgues, a tributary of the Dourdou de Camarès, flows through the commune and crosses the town. The Dourdou de Camarès flows northwestward through the western part of the commune and forms part of its northwestern border.

Population

Sights
An old bridge over the Sorgue and some megaliths in the neighborhood, especially, the dolmen of Tiergues, are of antiquarian interest.

Personalities
Saint-Affrique was the birthplace of:
 Pierre Frédéric Sarrus (1798–1861), mathematician
 Lucien Galtier (1812–1866), priest who built the first Catholic Church in Minnesota, USA
 Pierre-Auguste Sarrus (1813–1876), musician and inventor
 Noël Édouard, vicomte de Curières de Castelnau (1851-1944) General 
 Émile Borel (1871–1956), mathematician and politician
 Stéphane Diagana (born 1969), athlete
 Richard Sainct (born 1970), motorcycle racer

International relations
 The town is twinned with Driffield, in the East Riding of Yorkshire, England.

Saint-Affrique prize
The Grand Prix of Saint-Affrique has been awarded to noted Parisian painters since the second part of the 20th century. It consists of a month-long stay of at the hotel of famous chef François Decucq during which the painters could visit and paint one of the most beautiful county of France.
Some prize winners: Daniel du Janerand, Maurice Boitel.

See also

 List of European art awards
List of medieval bridges in France
Communes of the Aveyron department
Cazelle de Saint Affrique

References

External links

 Town council website (in French)
 Unofficial website about Saint-Affrique (in French)

Communes of Aveyron
Rouergue
Aveyron communes articles needing translation from French Wikipedia